Balladen is a hamlet in Rossendale, Lancashire, England. It is located south of the town of Rawtenstall.

External links

Hamlets in Lancashire
Geography of the Borough of Rossendale